Rhythmologa numerata is a species of moth of the family Tortricidae. It is found in Colombia and Tungurahua Province, Ecuador.

References

Moths described in 1926
Euliini